Mujhse Dosti Karoge! is a 2002 Indian Hindi-language coming-of-age romance comedy film directed by Kunal Kohli and produced by Yash Chopra for his banner, Yash Raj Films. The film stars Rani Mukherji, Hrithik Roshan and Kareena Kapoor in lead roles, with Uday Chopra in a cameo appearance. It follows the love triangle of 3 childhood friends: Pooja Sahani (Mukherji), Raj Khanna (Roshan) and Tina Kapoor (Kapoor). The film marked the first and only collaboration between Mukherji and Roshan.

Mujhse Dosti Karoge! marked the directorial debut of Kohli, who also wrote the dialogue and co-wrote the screenplay and story with Aditya Chopra. The film's cinematography was jointly handled by Ravi K. Chandran and Gopal Shah, while Rahul Sharma served as the soundtrack composer. 

Despite much hype due to its A-list star-cast, it failed to attract an audience, grossing , and received mixed reviews from critics upon release. 

For her portrayal of Tina, Kapoor was nominated for Best Supporting Actress at the 4th IIFA Awards, the only nomination for the film.

Plot 
Pooja Sahani, Raj Khanna and Tina Kapoor are childhood friends. While Raj has always been attracted to Tina, he is unaware that Pooja is secretly in love with him. Raj's father decides to move to London with his family because of his work. Before leaving, Raj makes Tina promise to keep in touch with him via e-mail. Tina, who is fun-loving and distracted, does not want the responsibility, so instead of her Pooja writes to Raj, signing the emails as "Tina" instead of her own name so that Tina can keep her promise to Raj. Over the years, they become close while exchanging e-mails to each other. 

15 years later, Raj returns to India for a vacation. By now, he is in love with the girl he has been writing to and believes he will recognise her at first sight. So they both decide not to exchange their photographs before his arrival. When the three meet, Raj walks past Pooja, not recognising her as he said he would, but recognises Tina, becoming smitten with her and thinking she wrote him the e-mails all these years. He does not notice that the real Tina is completely different from the Tina he knew from the e-mails. Tina later introduces Pooja, and they become friends again. Tina, despite being aware of the fact that she is not the one who Raj has been talking to for years and is also not the one he really loves, gives into his flirting and courting and falls in love with him. Their parents gladly announce their engagement. Heartbroken by this, Pooja decides to never disclose her feelings to anyone.

Raj returns to London, where Pooja travels for an interview. Raj takes Pooja to his favorite church and she accidentally hums the tune of a song he wrote for her many years ago. Hearing this, Raj instantly realises that Pooja is the one who had been writing to him all those years, and remembers all the little things he had shared in the e-mails that she knows about. He tells her she is the one he truly loves and the two decide to get married. Back in India, Tina's father dies, leaving her all alone. His last wish was that Tina would marry Raj, and Pooja's parents said that they will perform all the rituals in absence of Tina's parents. Seeing that Tina is alone now, Pooja refuses to marry Raj. Raj is against this and insists on telling his parents the truth but Pooja stops him. He angrily vows that he will only marry Tina if Pooja marries someone else on the same day.

The families travel to London for Raj and Tina's marriage. Rohan Verma, a friend of Raj, meets Pooja during the engagement party of Raj and Tina, and is instantly attracted to her. Pooja agrees to marry Rohan to satisfy Raj's ultimatum and ensure Tina's happiness. On the day of the marriage, Tina realises that Raj is in love with Pooja, as she sees that Raj's ancestral family bracelets were a better fit for Pooja's wrist than hers. At the altar, Tina confronts Raj and Pooja, saying that she is not alone and is glad to have such great friends who are willing to sacrifice their love for her. The film ends with Pooja and Raj getting married.

Cast 

 Rani Mukherji as Pooja Sahani
 Hrithik Roshan as Raj Khanna
 Kareena Kapoor as Tina Kapoor
 Barkha Singh as young Tina
 Uday Chopra as Rohan Verma (cameo appearance)
 Satish Shah as Mr. Sahani
 Himani Shivpuri as Mrs. Sahani
 Kiran Kumar as Mr. Khanna
 Smita Jaykar as Mrs. Khanna
 Sachin Khedekar as Mr. Kapoor
 Parikshat Sahni as Mr. Verma
 Maya Alagh as Mrs. Verma
 Raja Vaid as Ronnie

Production 
Mujhse Dosti Karoge! marked Kunal Kohli's directorial debut in Hindi Cinema. The media reported that the film was based on the 1996 American romantic comedy The Truth About Cats & Dogs, but Kohli explained that "not one scene from it is the same. There is a track dealing with mistaken identity, but it isn't a rip-off." It was produced by Yash Chopra under the banner of Yash Raj Films, and Aditya Chopra co-wrote the story and screenplay with Kohli. The dialogue was written by Kohli. Neil Nitin Mukesh served as the assistant director.

Rani Mukherji, Hrithik Roshan and Kareena Kapoor were cast as the leads; it marked the latter two's third collaboration, after Yaadein (2001) and Kabhi Khushi Kabhie Gham... (2001). 

Mukherji, who features as Pooja Sahani, said that she "loved every moment of working" on Mujhse Dosti Karoge!, and described the film as a "privilege" for her. 

Roshan portrays Raj Khanna, a part that he compared with his role in Kaho Naa... Pyaar Hai (2000). He spoke of his rapport with Mukherji, claiming that it "was a pleasure working with her. She is very professional, very friendly and easygoing. She leaves all negativity behind when she comes on the sets." Interviewed by Rediff.com, he said that Mujhse Dosti Karoge! was "a very, very intense film", adding, "The second half is propelled forward by the intensity of my character." He further stated that the film "more [...] about 3 friends than a love triangle".

Meanwhile, Kapoor stars as the fun-loving girl Tina Kapoor. She was initially reluctant to star in the film, because she was to play the film's second female lead after Mukherji. However, according to The Times of India, Kohli and Chopra convinced her to accept it. She found the role to be "very glamorous, typical of what people would expect of me", and believed that her fans, especially male, would like it. She noted, "I play a loser, yet emerge the winner. This is not a goody-goody heroine who gets the hero. My role has better scope. I am the life of the film. The other characters are sad most of the time." To prepare for her introductory scene, the actress did not eat for 3-4 days (this was inconsistently reported) as she wanted to "look great as it involved exposing my midriff". Moreover, Kapoor confessed that her looks were the main priority while preparing for her role in the film.

The filming took place in Film City, London and other places in both Switzerland and the United Kingdom. Ahmed Khan was the choreographer, while Manish Malhotra and Rocky Star were the costume designers. While Anuj Mathur designed the sound, Sharmishta Roy served as the art director. After the filming ended, Mujhse Dosti Karoge! was edited by Ritesh Soni and V. Karnik.

Soundtrack 

The soundtrack for Mujhse Dosti Karoge! was composed by the debutant Rahul Sharma; he accepted the offer in April 2001 when he was on a concert tour with his father Shivkumar Sharma. Rahul Sharma described its soundtrack as "young and fresh", adding, "[It] is about urban young people, so the music had to be romantic and soft." He used santoor, flute and an orchestra contains 60 violinists for the background score. In later years, he told The Hindu that composing the film's soundtrack was a "great" and "learning" experience. The lyrics were written by Anand Bakshi, with vocals performed by Alisha Chinai, Alka Yagnik, Asha Bhosle, Lata Mangeshkar, Udit Narayan, and Sonu Nigam. The soundtrack album was released on 12 July 2002 by Saregama.

According to the film-trade website Box Office India, with around 1.2 million units sold, the soundtrack became the eleventh highest-selling music album of the year. The soundtrack received mixed reviews from music critics; Narendra Kusnur of Mid-Day called it "hummable", and wrote, "Rahul's orchestration style is youthful, and the use of guitars is interesting and innovative." Kusnur, however, felt that "some songs have that typical [Yash] Chopra['s] banner flavour that has become very predictable and hackneyed of late". In a review published in the entertainment portal Bollywood Hungama, Joginder Tuteja believed that Sharma "does a superb job in churning out a number of melodies in one single package". The Hindu elaborated, "The title song ... is quite hummable. With quite a bit of Western tunes synthesized with Indian, this song is likely to hit the charts. A rather lengthy medley of various Hindi songs from old and new films is inserted."

Release 
Expectations for Mujhse Dosti Karoge! (one of the most-anticipated films of the year) were high, as the film was Kohli's debut as a film director, and due to its A-list star cast. It opened on 9 August 2002 and, conversely, emerged as a commercial failure. The film was released on 290 screens across India and grossed  on its opening day. It collected  in India and $2.6 million overseas. Box Office India estimated the film's total gross to be  and concluded its final commercial performance with the verdict of "flop". The film's world television premiere took place on 7 November 2002 on Zee Cinema, while its DVD version was released on 11 November 2003 in a single-disc pack. It was available for streaming on Amazon Prime Video on 8 March 2017.

Reception 
Mujhse Dosti Karoge! opened to mixed reviews; critics were appreciative of the leads' performances, but harshly criticized its "predictable" plot and "unremarkable" soundtrack. 

Writing for Bollywood Hungama, Taran Adarsh gave the film a rating of 1 star, noting that it "clearly belongs to Mukherji, who has the meatiest role comparatively". He believed that Mukherji was "superb in a role that fits her like a glove", but thought that Kapoor was "relegated to the background completely". In a 2.5 star review, Subhash K. Jha saw that "Kohli tries hard to bring in his own touch to the [Yash] Chopra-esque ambience". Derek Elley of Variety said that Kapoor "largely reprises her pampered bimbo" from Kabhi Khushi Kabhie Gham..., and praised Roshan for "proves a smart mover and good dance talent". Manish Gajjar of the BBC shared similar thoughts of Kapoor: "[She] as Tina looks ravishingly beautiful and shows great flair for comedy in this film. Although the audience will be reminded of her character of Poo from Kabhie Khushi Kabhie Gham...."

Outlook magazine's Namrata Joshi, who rated the film 1 star, declared it as "avoidable"; she was highly critical of Roshan, who she deemed "makes a poor parody of himself". Sukanya Verma opined, "First-time director Kohli is impressive. He keeps a tight grip of the plot and displays a keen attention to screenplay. Every character in the film is well-defined and sound. The film moves at a brisk pace and the audience is not left to pinpoint loopholes." Madhureeta Mukherjee of The Times of India claimed that Mukherji "scores almost full marks for her heart-rending performance", with Empire Omar Ahmed appreciated her for "saving" the film. Khalid Mohammed observed of Kapoor: "Of the cast, [She] is reliably spry and saucy but should take care not to repeat her hoity-toity act if she is to escape typecasting." S. Ramachandran from Mid-Day wrote that "Despite its numerous flaws, a fabulous performance by Roshan, an emotionally-powered role from Mukherji and a sporadically-intense act from Kapoor drive the film". Stardust hailed, "Though Kohli has handled some scenes with sensitivity and maturity he fails in many others, which gives the feeling of déjà vu."

Kapoor received a nomination in the Best Supporting Actress category at the 4th IIFA Awards.

References

External links 
 Official website
 
 

2002 films
2000s Hindi-language films
2002 romantic comedy-drama films
Films shot in London
Films shot in Switzerland
Yash Raj Films films
Films set in London
Indian remakes of American films
Films directed by Kunal Kohli
2002 directorial debut films
2002 drama films
Indian romantic comedy-drama films
Indian coming-of-age comedy-drama films
Films shot in Mumbai